Bendix Grodtschilling the Youngest (12 August 1686 – 23 March 1737) was a Danish painter and conchologist.

Grodtschilling was born in Copenhagen, the son of the painter Bendix Grodtschilling the Younger and grandson of the painter Bendix Grodtschilling the Elder. He took over from his father as royal court painter, but he struggled with debts and poor health. His wife was Agnes Margaret born Fogelman. Grodtschilling is buried in Trinitatis Church.

References 
 Bendix Grodtschilling of Art Index Denmark / Weilbachs Artist Encyclopedia
 This article is based mainly on Biography (s) of FJ Meier in the 1st edition of the Danish Biographical Encyclopedia, Volume 6, page 203, Published by CF Washer, Penguin (1887-1905). 

1686 births
1737 deaths
18th-century Danish painters
18th-century male artists
Danish male painters
Artists from Copenhagen